Barbie: Fairytopia is a 2005 computer-animated fantasy film directed by Walter P. Martishius and William Lau and written by Elise Allen and Diane Duane. It first premiered on Nickelodeon on March 6, 2005 and was later released to VHS and DVD 2 days later.

The 5th film in the Barbie film series and the first to have an original storyline not based on previous material, it follows the story of Elina, a wingless flower fairy who goes on a journey to save the enchanted land of Fairytopia. The film is followed by two sequels; Barbie: Mermaidia and Barbie Fairytopia: Magic of the Rainbow and two spin-offs; Barbie: Mariposa and Barbie: Mariposa & the Fairy Princess.

Plot
In the film, Barbie plays the role of Elina – a flower fairy who lives in the realm of Fairytopia with her puffball, Bibble. Unlike all other fairies, Elina does not have wings, which she is often ridiculed for. Elina and her friend Dandelion learn that one of Fairytopia’s guardians, Topaz, has supposedly been kidnapped. Elina returns to her flower home, Peony, in disbelief.

In truth, Topaz really has been kidnapped by Laverna, the evil twin sister of Fairytopia's benevolent ruler, the Enchantress. Laverna reveals that she incapacitated her sister with poison and plans to capture all seven of Fairytopia’s guardians. Meanwhile, Laverna’s minions will spread her mist-like formula all over Fairytopia, which will weaken all winged creatures. With no other options, the denizens of Fairytopia will turn to Laverna for a cure and crown her queen as a result.

In the morning, Elina and Bibble awaken to see that Peony as well as all the other fairy homes in the meadow are sick from Laverna's formula. Elina, Dandelion, and Bibble decide to seek help from the closest guardian, Azura. Upon entering a forest, Dandelion breathes some of Laverna's formula and is forced to return home when she becomes unable to fly.

After being turned away when they ask to see Azura, Elina and Bibble sneak to Azura's house, where she is discovered by Azura herself. Seeing a rainbow in Elina's eye, Azura invites them inside. She explains that the rainbow in Elina's eyes means she's destined for great things, which Elina, who does not believe in herself, disagrees with. Azura tells her that all of Fairytopia is in trouble because of Laverna and in the morning she will leave to speak to a dryad named Dahlia, a former follower of Laverna; she then asks Elina to take care of her magic necklace.

In the morning, as Azura is about to leave, she is kidnapped by a Fungus, one of Laverna's henchmen. Elina wakes up and is accused of being responsible for Azura's disappearance, but is rescued by Hue, a giant butterfly. In Laverna's lair, the Fungi arrive with Azura, but Laverna is angered when she finds her necklace missing. The Fungi tell Laverna that a wingless fairy had it. Realizing a wingless fairy would be unaffected by her formula, Laverna orders the Fungi to find Elina.

Hue and Elina are pursued by Laverna's firebirds. They manage to evade them when merman Prince Nalu gives them seaweed that allows them to breathe underwater. When the group finally reach Dahlia’s home, she is reluctant to help as the other guardians were mistrustful of her, but Elina convinces her to do the right thing. Dahlia tells Elina that Laverna found a way to suck the powers from the fairy guardians' necklaces and transfer them to herself, stating that the "union point" would be its weakness.

The group arrives at Laverna's lair, planning to go in and find the union point, but Elina insists on going by herself as she has Azura's necklace. While her friends cause a distraction, Elina makes it inside. Elina finds the guardians and her friends, captured by the Fungi. Laverna agrees to let them go if Elina returns Azura's necklace, which she refuses, whereupon Laverna notices the rainbow in her eye. Laverna promises that she can give Elina wings in exchange for returning Azura's necklace. Hypnotized, Elina walks toward Azura with the necklace. The union point—a crystal embedded in Laverna's throne—begins to absorb the power from the guardians' necklaces. Just as the Elina is about to return the necklace, Azura's words reach her, and she snaps out of her trance. Rejecting Laverna's offer, Elina hurls the necklace at the union point, shattering it. The guardians' powers overwhelm Laverna and she vanishes.

Back in the Magic Meadow, the fairies and the flowers are cured. Elina and her friends are visited by the recovered Enchantress. She thanks Elina and her friends for saving everyone and rewards her with her own magic necklace. The necklace magically bestows Elina with her own pair of wings. Overjoyed, Elina and her friends go flying together.

Voice cast

Sequels and spin-offs

Barbie Fairytopia: Mermaidia (2006) 
Barbie Fairytopia: Mermaidia, or simply Barbie: Mermaidia, is the first sequel to Barbie: Fairytopia and the 7th Barbie film. It premiered on Nickelodeon on March 5, 2006, and was later released to VHS and DVD on March 14, 2006. Lau and Martishius reprised their roles as directors. The plot involves Elina (Kelly Sheridan) who travels to Mermaidia to save her friend Nalu, the merman prince. Prince Nalu (Alessandro Juliani) has been kidnapped in an attempt to learn the whereabouts of a special berry that will make Laverna the most powerful fairy in Fairytopia. Elina finds herself needing the help of Nori (Chiara Zanni), a headstrong mermaid who doesn't trust outsiders and wants nothing to do with her. She also faces many challenges, including sacrificing her wings.

Barbie Fairytopia: Magic of the Rainbow (2007) 
Barbie Fairytopia: Magic of the Rainbow or simply Barbie: Magic of the Rainbow, is the second and final sequel of the Barbie: Fairytopia trilogy and the 10th Barbie film overall which premiered on Nickelodeon on March 11, 2007, and on DVD two days later. Lau reprised his role as director. The plot focuses on Elina and other fairy apprentices who are chosen for the annual "Flight of Spring" to create the first rainbow of the season using magic. They must spend time in learning how to perform this in the Fairy School at the magnificent Crystal Palace. But the evil fairy Laverna (Kathleen Barr) returns for her revenge and tries to stop the Flight of Spring, threatening to plunge Fairytopia into ten years of bitter winter. With their different gifts and personalities, Elina and her new friends must learn how to work together in order to defeat Laverna and bring the rainbow to life.

Soundtrack 
A soundtrack for the film was released on March 13, 2007. Composed by Eric Colvin, it features songs inspired by the film and an instrumental track. The soundtrack's track list is as follows:

 "The Magic of the Rainbow"
 "It's Nasty Being a Toad"
 "The Flight of Spring"
 "Could There Be Anything as Beautiful as Me?"
 "Learn Your Lessons"
 "The Magic of the Rainbow (Instrumental Mix)"
 "Luminessence"
 "You Are the Most"
 "I Must Be Strong"
 "The Flight of Spring (Reprise)"

Barbie: Mariposa (2008) 
Barbie: Mariposa, alternatively Barbie Fairytopia: Mariposa, Barbie as Mariposa and Barbie: Mariposa and her Butterfly Fairy Friends, is the first spin-off film to Barbie: Fairytopia and the 12th Barbie film overall which was released on February 26, 2008, and it made its American television premiere on Nickelodeon on March 2. Conrad Helten replaced Lau and/or Martishius as director, and would also be the first in his long line of directing Barbie films. The plot involves Mariposa (Chiara Zanni), a butterfly fairy who loves to read and dream about the world outside her home in the land of Flutterfield – which is protected by their queen's magical lights. But the evil fairy Henna (Nicole Oliver), in her scheme to overtake the kingdom, poisons the queen, resulting in the special lights dying out one by one. Mariposa, together with the twin sisters Rayna (Kathleen Barr) and Rayla (Erin Mathews), journey beyond the safe borders of the city in search of a hidden antidote that will save the queen and the kingdom.

Barbie: Mariposa & the Fairy Princess (2013) 
Barbie: Mariposa & the Fairy Princess, sometimes colloquially referred to as Barbie: Mariposa 2, is the second and final spin-off film of Barbie: Fairytopia which serves as its conclusion or epilogue and the 25th Barbie film overall which was released to DVD, Blu-ray and "Digital HD" on August 27, 2013, and it made its American television premiere on Nickelodeon on November 24. Lau returned to his role as director for this film. The plot focuses on Mariposa (Kelly Sheridan) becoming the royal Ambassador of Flutterfield and is sent to bring peace between her fairy land and their rivals, the Crystal Fairies of Shimmervale. Despite not making a great first impression on their king, Mariposa immediately befriends his shy daughter, Princess Catania (Maryke Hendrikse). However, a misunderstanding causes Mariposa to be banished from Shimmervale. As Mariposa and her puffball Zee return to Flutterfield, they encounter a dark fairy named Gwillion on her way to destroy Shimmervale. Mariposa rushes back and helps Princess Catania to save her fairy land.

References

External links

2005 direct-to-video films
Films set in the 2000s
Films set in 2005
Films set in the 21st century
Barbie films
2005 computer-animated films
2000s English-language films
2000s children's fantasy films
Lionsgate films
Lionsgate animated films
2000s American animated films
Films about witchcraft
American direct-to-video films
American children's animated fantasy films
Canadian children's fantasy films
Canadian animated feature films
Films set in Europe
Films set in a fictional country
Canadian direct-to-video films
Films about fairies and sprites
2000s children's animated films
2005 films
2000s Canadian films